Ludo is the first album to be released by St. Louisian pop punk band Ludo on indie label Redbird Records. It was released April 6, 2004 and was re-released on September 29, 2009.

Track listing

Personnel
Band
Andrew Volpe - Vocals, Guitar
Tim Ferrell - Guitar, Vocals
Tim Convy - Vocals, Moog Synthesizer
Matt Palermo - Drums
Marshall Fanciullo- Bass
Production
Jimmy Callahan - Producer, Engineer, Mixing
Allan Hessler - Assistant Engineer, Assistant

References

Ludo (band) albums
2003 debut albums